= The Moving Picture World =

1907-1927 American film industry magazine

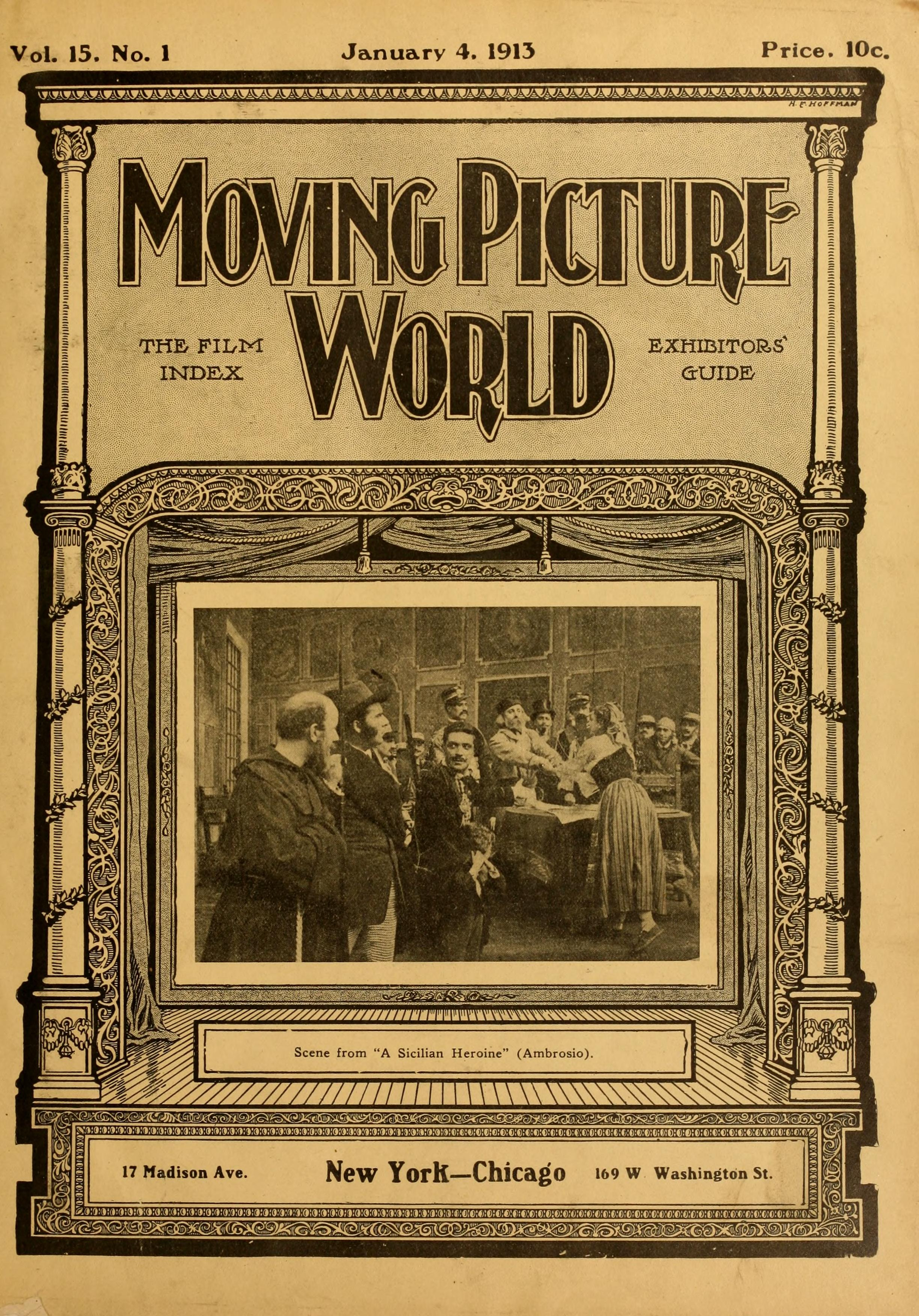
- January 4, 1913 cover, featuring a scene from A Sicilian Heroine, an Italian film
- Categories: Film; Entertainment
- First issue: March 9, 1907
- Final issue: December 31, 1927
- Country: United States
- Based in: New York City
- Language: English
- OCLC: 1717051

The Moving Picture World was an influential early trade journal for the American film industry, from 1907 to 1927. An industry powerhouse at its height, Moving Picture World frequently reiterated its independence from the film studios.

In 1911, the magazine bought out Views and Film Index. Its reviews illustrate the standards and tastes of film in its infancy, and shed light on story content in those early days. By 1914, it had a reported circulation of approximately 15,000.

== History ==
Moving Picture World spent much of its early effort chronicling the battle of filmmakers against the movie censorship movement.

The publication was founded by James Petrie (J.P.) Chalmers, Jr. (1866–1912), who began publishing in March 1907 as The Moving Picture World and View Photographer.

Moving Picture World quickly became closely involved with the movement of puritanical forces in American society for the censorship of the new medium of film. With local and state censorship boards profligating, the trade journal sought some sort of centralizing body to reduce the financial and artistic impact of prior restraint. In January 1909, MPW writer W. Stephen Bush opined:

"There is no doubt that the moving picture field needs supervision, and supervision and censorship express in different words the same idea. The question is: How is this censorship to come? Do we want it to appear in the shape of a blue coat and brass buttons and a club or are we resolved that it come from within the ranks of the makers of films and the exchanges and the exhibitors? ... The Moving Picture World suggested some months ago the creation of a board of censors, in which besides the film makers the exchanges and the exhibitors should have representation."

Largely through the publication's inditiative a National Board of Censorship of Motion Pictures emerged early in 1909 in New York City, a social reform body funded by the film industry, which gradually emerged as the national film censorship agency until being supplanted by the Motion Picture Association of America in the mid-20th century.

In December 1927, it was announced that the publication was merging with the Exhibitors Herald, when it was reported the combined circulation of the papers would be 16,881. In 1931, a subsequent merger with the Motion Picture News occurred, creating the Motion Picture Herald.

A Spanish language version of the magazine, entitled Cine-Mundial, was published from 1916 to 1948.

Two indexes have been published to assist in locating information in this valuable journal: An Index to Short and Feature Film Reviews in the Moving Picture World: The Early Years, 1907–1915 and Filmmakers in The Moving Picture World: An Index of Articles, 1907–1927.
